Charles Ernest Nornable (25 December 1886 — 21 April 1970) was an English cricketer who played for Derbyshire in 1909.

Nornable was born in Norton, in Derbyshire.

Nornable played just one game for the Derbyshire team in the 1909 season which was against Sussex in May. Demands of his business prevented him from playing further games for Derbyshre. He was a right-arm medium-fast bowler, and in the first innings, he took three wickets, including that of Test cricketer Harry Butt. In the second innings he took two more wickets. He was a right-handed batsman and scored 8 runs.

Nornable died in hospital in Sheffield at the age of 83. His son Gordon Nornable was decorated for  underground service with the French resistance during World War II.

References

1886 births
1970 deaths
English cricketers
Derbyshire cricketers